Teudis is a genus of anyphaenid sac spiders first described by O. Pickard-Cambridge in 1896.

Species
 it contains twenty-seven species:
Teudis angusticeps (Keyserling, 1891) – Brazil
Teudis atrofasciatus Mello-Leitão, 1922 – Brazil
Teudis bicornutus (Tullgren, 1905) – Bolivia
Teudis buelowae (Mello-Leitão, 1946) – Paraguay
Teudis cambridgei Chickering, 1940 – Panama
Teudis comstocki (Soares & Camargo, 1948) – Brazil
Teudis concolor (Keyserling, 1891) – Brazil
Teudis cordobensis Mello-Leitão, 1941 – Argentina
Teudis dichotomus Mello-Leitão, 1929 – Brazil
Teudis fatuus (Mello-Leitão, 1942) – Brazil, Argentina
Teudis formosus (Keyserling, 1891) – Brazil
Teudis gastrotaeniatus Mello-Leitão, 1944 – Argentina
Teudis geminus Petrunkevitch, 1911 – Guatemala, Costa Rica, Panama, Ecuador
Teudis griseus (Keyserling, 1891) – Brazil
Teudis itatiayae Mello-Leitão, 1915 – Brazil
Teudis juradoi Chickering, 1940 – Panama
Teudis lenis (Keyserling, 1891) – Brazil
Teudis morenus (Mello-Leitão, 1941) – Argentina
Teudis opertaneus (Keyserling, 1891) – Brazil
Teudis parvulus (Keyserling, 1891) – Brazil
Teudis peragrans (O. Pickard-Cambridge, 1898) – Guatemala, Brazil
Teudis recentissimus (Keyserling, 1891) – Brazil
Teudis roseus F. O. Pickard-Cambridge, 1900 – Panama
Teudis suspiciosus (Keyserling, 1891) – Brazil
Teudis tensipes (Keyserling, 1891) – Brazil
Teudis tensus (Keyserling, 1891) – Brazil
Teudis ypsilon Mello-Leitão, 1922 – Brazil

References

Anyphaenidae
Araneomorphae genera
Spiders of Central America
Spiders of South America